Tetens may refer to:

People
 Alfred Tetens (1835-1903), German explorer
 Axel Tetens (1892–1961), Danish Olympic wrestler
 Johannes Nikolaus Tetens (1736–1807), German-Danish philosopher and scientist
 Otto Tetens (1865–1945), German scientist
 T.H. Tetens (1899-1976), Jewish German journalist

Other uses
 Tetens equation, calculates the saturation vapor pressure of water over liquid and ice

See also
 Teten